Judge Murphy may refer to:

Bernard Murphy (judge) (fl. 1970s–2010s), judge of the Federal Court of Australia
Diana E. Murphy (1934–2018), judge of the United States Court of Appeals for the Eighth Circuit
Edward Preston Murphy (1904–1958), judge of the United States District Court for the Northern District of California
Eric E. Murphy (born 1979), judge of the United States Court of Appeals for the Sixth Circuit
G. Patrick Murphy (born 1948), judge of the United States District Court for the Southern District of Illinois
Harold Lloyd Murphy (born 1927), judge of the United States District Court for the Northern District of Georgia
John W. Murphy (Pennsylvania politician) (1902–1962), judge of the United States District Court for the Middle District of Pennsylvania
Michael R. Murphy (born 1947), judge of the United States Court of Appeals for the Tenth Circuit
Stephen Murphy III (born 1962), judge of the United States District Court for the Eastern District of Michigan
Thomas Francis Murphy (1905–1995), judge of the United States District Court for the Southern District of New York
Thomas W. Murphy (Illinois judge) (fl. 1990s–2000s), judge of the Cook County Circuit Court

See also
Justice Murphy (disambiguation)